Lilia Dale (born 18 July 1919) is an Italian retired film actress.

Selected filmography
 Il signor Max (1937)
 Nonna Felicità (1938)
 Mad Animals (1939)
 Who Are You? (1939)
 Red Tavern (1940)
 Manon Lescaut (1940)

References

Bibliography
 Bert Cardullo. Vittorio De Sica: Actor, Director, Auteur. Cambridge Scholars Publishing, 2009.

External links

1919 births
Possibly living people
Italian film actresses
Italian stage actresses
People from Pula

Istrian Italian people